The 2016 Atlantic 10 Conference women's soccer tournament was the postseason women's soccer tournament for the Atlantic 10 Conference held from November 3 to 6, 2016. The seven-match tournament was held at the URI Soccer Complex in Kingston, Rhode Island. The eight team single-elimination tournament consisted of three rounds based on seeding from regular season conference play. The Duquesne Dukes were the defending tournament champions, defeating the Fordham Rams in the 2015 championship match. Dayton, 7-0 winners over Saint Joseph's, took the crown in 2016. It was the second straight year that a 7-seed won the A10 Conference tournament. The final match was televised on American Sports Network (ASN).

Bracket

Schedule

Quarterfinals

Semifinals

Final

References 
2016 Atlantic 10 Women's Soccer Championship

 
Atlantic 10 Conference Women's Soccer Tournament